The 2019–20 season was the 110th season in existence of Bologna and the fifth consecutive season in Serie A and 73rd in total. Having finished 10th the previous season, Bologna competed solely in domestic competitions, in Serie A and the Coppa Italia.

The season was coach Siniša Mihajlović's first full campaign in charge of the club, after having replaced Filippo Inzaghi in January 2019. However, Mihajlović held a press conference on 13 July, following reports of a serious illness, in which he announced that he was battling leukemia. Immediately following the announcement, the club insisted that Mihajlović would remain coach and could continue working so long as he felt able to do so.

Players

Squad information

Transfers

In

Loans in

Out

Loans out

Pre-season and friendlies

Competitions

Serie A

League table

Results summary

Results by round

Matches

Coppa Italia

Statistics

Appearances and goals

|-
! colspan=14 style=background:#dcdcdc; text-align:center| Goalkeepers

|-
! colspan=14 style=background:#dcdcdc; text-align:center| Defenders

|-
! colspan=14 style=background:#dcdcdc; text-align:center| Midfielders

|-
! colspan=14 style=background:#dcdcdc; text-align:center| Forwards

|-
! colspan=14 style=background:#dcdcdc; text-align:center| Players transferred out during the season

Goalscorers

Last updated: 7 February 2020

Clean sheets

Last updated: 7 February 2020

Disciplinary record

Last updated: 7 February 2020

References

Bologna F.C. 1909 seasons
Bologna